The 1867 California gubernatorial election was held on September 4, 1867, to elect the governor of California.

Results

References

1867
California
gubernatorial
September 1867 events